Centon may refer to:

 Centon (Battlestar Galactica), a fictional unit of time from the 1978 Battlestar Galactica American television series
 Centon, a range of photographic equipment sold in the United Kingdom by Jessops